The Tulane Green Wave college baseball team represents Tulane University in the American Athletic Conference (AAC). The Green Wave compete as part of the National Collegiate Athletic Association Division I.  The team has had 24 head coaches since it started playing organized baseball in the 1893 season.

Key

Coaches

Sources:

Notes

References

Lists of college baseball head coaches in the United States

Tulane Green Wave baseball coaches